{{Automatic taxobox
| name = Earthworm eel
| image = Chaudhuria caudata.jpg
| image_caption = Chaudhuria caudata
| taxon = Chaudhuriidae
| authority = Annandale, 1918
| subdivision_ranks = Genera
| subdivision = 
Bihunichthys Kottelat & Lim, 1994
Chaudhuria Annandale, 1918
Chendol Kottelat & Lim, 1994
Garo Yazdani & Talwar, 1981
Nagaichthys Kottelat & Lim, 1991
Pillaia Yazdani, 1972
Pillaiabrachia Britz, 2016 <ref name=Britz2016>Britz, R. (2016): Pillaiabrachia siniae, a new species of earthworm eel from northern Myanmar (Teleostei: Synbranchiformes: Chaudhuriidae). Ichthyological Exploration of Freshwaters, 27 (1): 41-47.</ref>
}}

Chaudhuriidae, is a family of small freshwater eel-like fish related to the swamp eels and spiny eels, commonly known as the earthworm eels. The known species are literally the size and shape of earthworms, thus the family name. While one species, Chaudhuria caudata was reported from the Inle Lake by Nelson Annandale in 1918, the others have been only recently reported (since the 1970s), all in the eastern Asia area, from India to Korea.

Neither the dorsal nor anal fins have spines, and in Nagaichthys and Pillaia they have fused with the caudal fin; in the other genera, the caudal is small but separate.  Their bodies have no scales. The few specimens found to date have been no longer than 8 cm, and Nagaichthys filipes'' is only known to reach 3.1 cm.  The eyes are small, covered in thick skin. Almost nothing is known of the habits and biology of the earthworm eels.

The family name "Chaudhuriidae" comes from a Burmese local name for a fish.

References

Chaudhuriidae